Thomas or Tom Dempsey may refer to:

Thomas W. Dempsey (born 1931), American politician in Pennsylvania
Tom Dempsey (1947–2020), American football player
Tom Dempsey (hurler) (born 1965), Irish hurler
Tom Dempsey (Missouri politician) (born 1967), American restaurateur and politician
Tommy Dempsey (born 1974), American basketball coach